Jean-Paul Cottret (born June 19, 1963 in Gien) is a French rally navigator, best known for his seven success in the Dakar Rally alongside Stéphane Peterhansel.

Biography
Cottret's partnership with Peterhansel began during the 1999 event, in which the pair placed seventh overall in the car category. Switching to the factory Mitsubishi team, the pair won the Dakar in 2004, 2005 and 2007 before adding a fourth success in 2012 at the wheel of an X-Raid prepared Mini.

In addition to their Dakar success, Cottret and Peterhansel have been successful in other minor rally raid events, such as the Abu Dhabi Desert Challenge, Spanish Baja and Rally Morocco.

Achievements

Dakar Rally

References

1963 births
People from Gien
Living people
French rally co-drivers
Dakar Rally co-drivers
Sportspeople from Loiret